Sunan Drajat was born in 1470 CE. He was one of the Wali Songo or "nine Saints", along with his father Sunan Ampel and his brother Sunan Bonang.

He was a descendant of Majapahit nobility in Tuban and a Chinese captain named Gan Eng Cu.

Like his brother, he composed gamelan songs as a means for spreading Islamic teachings on Java. One example was the tune Gending 'Pangkur'''.

In 1502 CE, he built the masjid in the village of Jelag in Paciran (north of Surabaya) 

 Notes and references 

Sunyoto, Agus (2014). Atlas Wali Songo: Buku Pertama yang Mengungkap Wali Songo Sebagai Fakta Sejarah''. 6th edition. Depok: Pustaka IIMaN.

See also

Islam in Indonesia
The spread of Islam in Indonesia (1200 to 1600)
Ali al-Uraidhi ibn Ja'far al-Sadiq

Wali Sanga
Indonesian people of Chinese descent